The Kidder County Courthouse in Steele, North Dakota was built in 1883. It was listed on the National Register of Historic Places in 1985. In 1913, the third story roof was replaced and the entrance was moved.

In 1985 it was then the longest-serving courthouse building in the state.

The Stutsman County Courthouse building is older, but was no longer in use as a courthouse.

References

Courthouses on the National Register of Historic Places in North Dakota
County courthouses in North Dakota
Italianate architecture in North Dakota
Government buildings completed in 1883
1883 establishments in Dakota Territory
National Register of Historic Places in Kidder County, North Dakota